is a Japanese/American original net animation series based on the 1980s Japanese manga series Saint Seiya by Masami Kurumada.

Plot
Seiya, a young teen, is recruited by Alman Kiddo to become a fabled . The series follows the Bronze Knights as they fight prolific warriors in the quest of becoming Goddess Athena warriors, while Seiya at the same time is looking for his missing sister.

Voice cast

Production
The series was first revealed to be in the works in December 2016 at CCXP in Brazil. On August 2, 2017, Cinematoday.jp published an article which revealed that the project was a collaboration with Netflix to make a new adaptation of the manga and anime classic series. Yoshiharu Ashino was announced as the director, and Eugene Son among others as the writers. The first six episodes were released on Netflix on July 19, 2019, and loosely adapts the "Galaxian Wars" and the "Black Knights" arcs from the manga. Another six episodes that loosely adapt the "Silver Knights" arc were released on January 23, 2020.

A second season, titled Knights of the Zodiac: Saint Seiya – Battle for Sanctuary, was announced on June 29, 2022. It premiered on July 31, 2022. Crunchyroll licensed the sequel outside of Asia. On December 3, 2022, the show's renewal for a third season was announced.

Series overview

Episode list

Season 1 (2019–20)

Season 2 (2022)

Reception 
The Review Geek rated the series 3.5 out of 10; Ready Steady Cut gave a 2.5 out of 5 rating and called the show "dull and uninspiring". Initial backlash to the series began before it aired, when it was revealed that Shun, a male in the original manga and series, had been swapped to a female character. The writer of the series, Eugene Son, justified this change after thinking the Knights needed more female representation. He explained that while the original show had some excellent core concepts, the one thing that bothered him about it was that “the Bronze Knights with Pegasus Seiya are all dudes”. However, this decision received backlash from fans of the original series for a multitude of reasons. One example includes the complete erasure of explanation for Marin's mask. The gender swap of Shun, who was the only main male character of the original series who did not fit in the stereotype of the male hero - slightly effeminate, sensitive and opposed to fighting - was seen as special interest pandering by some and reinforcing gender stereotypes by others.

References

External links
 
 Knights of the Zodiac: Saint Seiya (ONA) at Anime News Network's encyclopedia

2019 anime ONAs
Anime series based on manga
Martial arts anime and manga
Netflix original anime
Saint Seiya
Toei Animation television
Japanese computer-animated television series
2010s American adult animated television series
American adult computer-animated television series